Cédric Vitu (born August 18, 1985) is a French professional boxer. He held the European light middleweight title between 2015 and 2017, the European Union light middleweight title between 2011 and 2012, and challenged for the WBA light middleweight title in 2018.

Professional career
Vitu first challenged for the EBU title on 2012, facing the undefeated Sergey Rabchenko in Manchester on the undercard of Ricky Hatton's comeback bout against Vyacheslav Senchenko. Rabchenko, promoted by Hatton, prevailed on a split decision.

In June 2015, Vitu got another shot at the EBU title against Orlando Fiordigiglio in Brescia. He won the title beating Fiordigiglio by technical knockout in round 11. Back in France, Vitu retained his belt against Roberto Santos in December 2015 and Ruben Varon in March 2016. He was named European Boxer of the Year by the EBU in June 2016. Vitu notched another successful defense against Isaac Real in January 2017. In May, he fought in an IBF title eliminator against Marcello Matano. Vitu defeated Matano with a round 10 TKO, becoming the mandatory challenger to IBF champion, Jarrett Hurd. Following his win, Vitu vacated the EBU title.

References

1985 births
Living people
French male boxers
Light-middleweight boxers
Southpaw boxers
European Boxing Union champions
People from Creil
Sportspeople from Oise